The Marquette Hotel was a historic hotel located at the southeast corner of 18th Street and Washington Avenue at 1734 Washington Avenue in St. Louis, Missouri.  The building was designed by architects Barnett, Haynes & Barnett.  Construction began in 1906, and it was completed in 1907.  The hotel was ten stories high and featured extensive terra-cotta and limestone ornamentation and bay windows.

The hotel remained in business until 1977.  It was listed in the National Register of Historic Places in 1985, but it was demolished soon after this in 1988 to make room for a parking lot.  The hotel had also been known as the Milner Hotel.  Soon after to was demolished, many similar old downtown buildings in St. Louis like this one were converted into condominiums and apartments.

It is still listed on the National Register despite having been demolished, according to the National Register Information System.

The building was enriched by terra cotta ornamentation designed by George Julian Zolnay, including a bacchanalian themed entrance-way "replete with horned and bearded masks and draped grape leaf garlands enframing a cartouche with the
Marquette Hotel monogram."

References

National Register of Historic Places in St. Louis
Neoclassical architecture in Missouri
Chicago school architecture in Missouri
Hotel buildings completed in 1907
Hotels in Missouri
Hotels established in 1906
Buildings and structures in St. Louis
Hotel buildings on the National Register of Historic Places in Missouri
1906 establishments in Missouri
Buildings and structures demolished in 1988
Demolished hotels in the United States
Demolished buildings and structures in St. Louis